Bogdan Gheorghiu is a Romanian politician who has been serving as Minister of Culture in the Cîțu Cabinet, led by Prime Minister Florin Cîțu, . He previously served in this position in the first cabinet and second cabinet led by Ludovic Orban. He is affiliated with the National Liberal Party (PNL).

References 

Living people
Year of birth missing (living people)
Place of birth missing (living people)
21st-century Romanian politicians
National Liberal Party (Romania) politicians
Romanian Ministers of Culture